Uvda is the name of a region in the southern Negev desert, directly north of Eilat.

The name derives from the Hebrew word uvda (meaning fact). The region was captured during Operation Uvda in the 1948 Arab-Israeli War, when the Israel Defense Forces entered the area with the stated aim of establishing 'facts on the ground', hence the name.

The Uvda Valley is known for the 7000-year-old  archaeological site.

See also
Ovda Airport

External links
Prehistoric site and temple
 Uvda open sanctuary
 Replica of the temple leopards, The Israel Museum

References

Eilat
Regions of Israel